The Schütte-Lanz G.IV was a bomber designed at the Luftschiffbau Schütte-Lanz (Schütte-Lanz airship works), in Germany, that remained a project, with no aircraft being built. The G.IV was to have been a twin-engined triplane

References

G.IV